Forest Davis (March 28, 1879 – January 27, 1958) was an American politician from the state of Iowa.

Davis was born in Wayne County, Iowa, in 1879. He served as a Democrat for one term in the Iowa House of Representatives from January 9, 1933, to January 13, 1935. Davis died in Centerville, Appanoose County, Iowa in 1958. He was interred in Oakland Cemetery, Moulton, Iowa.

References

1879 births
1958 deaths
20th-century American politicians
Democratic Party members of the Iowa House of Representatives
People from Wayne County, Iowa